James R. Lewis (November 3, 1949 - October 11, 2022) was an American philosophy professor at Wuhan University. Lewis was an academic, scholar of religious studies, sociologist of religion, and writer, specializing in the academic study of new religious movements, astrology, and New Age.

Early life
Lewis was born in Leonardtown, Maryland, and raised in New Port Richey, Florida. In his youth, in the early and mid-seventies, he was a member of Yogi Bhajan's 3HO, a new religious movement combining the teachings of kundalini yoga and Sikhism. Feeling disenchanted with the organization, he formed a small and short-lived breakaway movement.

Education 
Lewis received his Ph.D. in Religious Studies from the University of Wales, Lampeter, in the United Kingdom, and pursued a career as a professional reference book writer in the 1990s.

Works 
In 1992, he formed an academic association called AWARE, with the primary goal "to promote intellectual and religious freedom by educating the general public about existing religions and cultures, including, but not limited to, alternative religious groups." Describing its outlook as "scholarly and non-sectarian", AWARE stated that it sought to educate scholars and the general public about the persecution of religious and cultural minorities in the United States and abroad, and to assist the United States in its efforts to counter prejudice. 

Other scholars involved in the formulation of AWARE as an "anti-anti-cult organization" included Eileen Barker, David G. Bromley, and Jeffrey Hadden, who felt a need for an organization of academics prepared to appear as expert witnesses in court cases. AWARE proved controversial; critics complained that Lewis associated too closely with NRM members, and Lewis dissolved the body in December 1995 after concerns from members of its advisory board.

Some months prior, in May 1995, Lewis, fellow scholar Gordon Melton and religious freedom lawyer Barry Fisher had flown to Japan in the early stages of investigations into the sarin gas attack on the Tokyo subway to voice their concern that police behaviour, including mass detentions without charge and the removal of practitioners' children from the group, might be infringing the civil rights of Aum Shinrikyo members. They had travelled to Japan at the invitation and expense of Aum Shinrikyo after they had contacted the group to express concern over developments, and met with officials over a period of three days. While not having been given access to the group's chemical laboratories, they held press conferences in Japan stating their belief, based on the documentation they had been given by the group, that the group did not have the ability to produce sarin and was being scapegoated. Lewis likened the group's treatment to a Japanese Waco. The scholars' defense of Aum Shinrikyo led to a crisis of confidence in religious scholarship when the group turned out to have been responsible for the attack after all.

Lewis edited a series on Contemporary Religions for Brill, and co-edited a series on Controversial New Religions for Ashgate. He was a co-founder of the International Society for the Study of New Religions and editor-in-chief of the Alternative Spirituality & Religion Review (ASSR). He taught in the University of Wisconsin System, where he edited a book titled Scientology, and, on an adjunct basis, at DePaul University.  Lewis was an Associate Professor of Religious Studies at the University of Tromsø and Honorary Senior Research Fellow at the University of Wales, Lampeter, before becoming a professor at Wuhan University in Wuhan, Hubei, China.

Reception
A prolific author, Lewis won a Choice Outstanding Academic Titles award in 1999 for Cults in America. The Choice review described it as a "very readable book" that offered a "balanced overview of controversies centering on cults in America", containing basic information on several dozen groups, as well as the more general conflict between "anti-cultists" seeking government assistance to eliminate cults, and religious "libertarians" defending religious liberty even for disliked groups. The review stated that while Lewis differed with the anti-cult view, he presented "arguments and references from both sides – respectfully and in language free from insinuation or invective. Strongly recommended". Lewis won another Choice Outstanding Academic Title award, for The Oxford Handbook of New Religious Movements, with a second edition of this handbook published in 2016 with Inga Tøllefsen as co-editor. He has also won New York Public Library and American Library Association awards for his reference book Violence and New Religious Movements.

The work of AWARE in the 1990s was criticized by Benjamin Beit-Hallahmi, who alleged that Lewis was disseminating movement "propaganda", and used poor research methods. This echoed earlier criticisms in a Skeptic article by Stephen A. Kent and Theresa Krebs, who felt that materials produced by Lewis and J. Gordon Melton on the Church Universal and Triumphant and The Family in their joint work Sex, Slander, and Salvation, were "as much an apology as a social scientific product". Anson Shupe and Susan E. Darnell in turn characterised Kent's and Krebs' paper as an ad-hominem attack, and part of a pattern of accusing scholars of bias when their field research produced findings at variance with anti-cult stereotypes. Melton defended their joint work , stating that far from being a public relations exercise, the AWARE report on the Church Universal and Triumphant had "startled and upset" the group's leadership, and led to wide-ranging changes in the organization. Jeffrey Kaplan stated that the aims of AWARE had been "laudable", but that the risks involved for academics in joining the "cult wars", as well as the organization's apparently unsuccessful appeals for funding from new religious movements, led to controversy.

In December 2017 conference, Lewis was quoted by Xinhua News Agency as claiming that Falun Gong-founded media Sound of Hope and New Tang Dynasty Television "are in fact manipulated and sponsored by international anti-China forces". In 2018, Lewis authored Falun Gong: Spiritual Warfare and Martyrdom. Lewis edited Enlightened Martyrdom: The Hidden Side of Falun Gong (2019).

References

External links
 James R. Lewis publications list

American astrologers
American religion academics
Researchers of new religious movements and cults
Alumni of the University of Wales, Lampeter
People associated with the University of Wales, Lampeter
DePaul University faculty
University of Wisconsin–Madison faculty
1949 births
Western esotericism scholars